Prince-primate (German: Fürstprimas, Hungarian: hercegprímás) is a rare princely title held by individual (prince-) archbishops of specific sees in a presiding capacity in an august assembly of mainly secular princes, notably the following:

Germany - Confederation of the Rhine
The  or 'Confederation of the Rhine' was founded in 1806, when several German states seceded from the Holy Roman Empire and allied themselves with Emperor Napoleon of France, who assumed the position of the Protector of the Confederation of the Rhine. Its highest office was held by Karl Theodor von Dalberg, first Archbishop of Mainz and then of Regensburg. As such he presided over the College of Kings and the Diet of the Confederation, a senate-like assembly which never actually assembled.

During his term as prince-primate, Dalberg was Archbishop of Regensburg (in Bavaria) and at first  (ruling prince) of Aschaffenburg. Since September 19, 1806 his territories included the former  and on February 16, 1810 Dalberg was promoted to the strictly secular rank of Grand Duke of Frankfurt, in chief of another former  (on the lower Main, enclaved in the Electorate of Mainz, now in Hessen). At the same time, Napoleon appointed his stepson Eugène de Beauharnais — excluded from the French imperial succession — as heir to the Grand Duchy.

At the eve of the collapse of the First French Empire, Dalberg resigned his secular positions and Beauharnais succeeded him as Grand Duke, though this had no practical effect, as the dissolution of the Confederation (carved up into a revised set of monarchies) also rendered the position moot.

Hungary
In virtue of his dignity as primate of the Habsburg dynasty's apostolic Kingdom of Hungary, the Archbishop of Esztergom enjoyed extraordinary privileges, resulting in his being titled prince primate.

He was the chief and privy chancellor of the Hungarian kingdom, and thus keeper of the great seal. To the primate also belonged the right (delegated regalia) to superintend the royal mint at Kremnica, for which he received a significant sum from its seigniorage revenues, called  ('right of'). By ancient custom, he had the right to crown the King of Hungary and anoint the queen. By a gift of archiepiscopal property he was at one time able to confer nobility, another rarely delegated princely prerogative (usually only knighting was allowed to non-sovereign nobility). Another privilege was his right to take an oath before a court of justice through his deputy, and not personally.

The primate was also chief priest and chancellor of the Hungarian national Order of St. Stephen, established in 1764. As first banneret of Hungary, he was a Magnate, i.e. member of the Upper House.

References

Sources
 
 Westermann,  (in German)
 WorldStatesmen - here Frankfurt, see also other parties mentioned

Catholic ecclesiastical titles
Catholic Church in Hungary
Titles of national or ethnic leadership